Elma is a city in Grays Harbor County, Washington, United States. The population was 3,438 at the 2020 census.

Geography
Elma is located at  (47.005648, -123.406268).

Climate
According to the Köppen Climate Classification system, Elma has a warm-summer Mediterranean climate, abbreviated "Csb" on climate maps. Summers are warm and dry, while winters are cool and very wet. Some form of precipitation occurs on half of all days on average.

<div style="width:75%">

History
First settled in 1853 by D.F. Byles, Elma was later named for Union soldier Elmer Brown.  The city of Elma was incorporated on March 22, 1888.

Notable people
 Kyle Basler, won nine letters at Elma High School as a standout in football, basketball and baseball, winning Class 2A state championships in football and basketball during the 1997-1998 school year. He then went on to Washington State University where he was their first-team punter for four seasons. In 2006 he was signed as an undrafted free agent by the Cleveland Browns of the NFL. He was the punter for the Frankfurt Galaxy of NFL Europa during the 2007 season.
 Jamie Craighead, 1998 Washington state Class 2A Women's High School Player of the Year. She then had a fine career at the University of Oregon, helping them win the 2002 Women's National Invitation Tournament. She has also been the head coach of the Sacramento State (2009-2013) and San Jose State (2014-2022) Women's basketball programs.
 Rod "the Rifle" Derline, basketball player. Led Elma High School to the 1970 Class A state championship game. He then had a fine career at Seattle University and was inducted into their basketball hall of fame in 2006. He was drafted by the Seattle SuperSonics in the 10th round (169th overall) in the 1974 NBA Draft and, despite long odds, played for the Sonics during the 1974-1975 and 1975-1976 seasons.
 Lloyd Jones, Alaskan state senator
 Bud Ward, golfer

Demographics

2010 census
As of the census of 2010, there were 3,107 people, 1,209 households, and 788 families living in the city. The racial makeup of the city was 85.8% White, 1.0% African American, 2.6% Native American, 2.1% Asian, 0.4% Pacific Islander, 3.2% from other races, and 4.9% from two or more races. Hispanic or Latino of any race were 6.6% of the population.

There were 1,209 households, of which 34.7% had children under the age of 18 living with them, 42.8% were married couples living together, 16.2% had a female householder with no husband present, 6.2% had a male householder with no wife present, and 34.8% were non-families. 27.7% of all households were made up of individuals, and 11.7% had someone living alone who was 65 years of age or older. The average household size was 2.53 and the average family size was 3.02.

The median age in the city was 36.1 years. 25.9% of residents were under the age of 18; 9.2% were between the ages of 18 and 24; 25.4% were from 25 to 44; 26.6% were from 45 to 64; and 12.9% were 65 years of age or older. The gender makeup of the city was 49.1% male and 50.9% female.

2000 census
As of the census of 2000, there were 3,049 people, 1,195 households, and 764 families living in the city. The population density was 1,812.6 people per square mile (700.7/km2). There were 1,330 housing units at an average density of 790.7 per square mile (305.7/km2). The racial makeup of the city was 90.98% White, 0.59% African American, 1.31% Native American, 1.28% Asian, 0.26% Pacific Islander, 1.64% from other races, and 3.94% from two or more races. Hispanic or Latino of any race were 3.64% of the population.

There were 1,195 households, out of which 35.5% had children under the age of 18 living with them, 44.9% were married couples living together, 13.6% had a female householder with no husband present, and 36.0% were non-families. 27.5% of all households were made up of individuals, and 12.3% had someone living alone who was 65 years of age or older. The average household size was 2.51 and the average family size was 3.06.

In the city, the population was spread out, with 29.2% under the age of 18, 9.1% from 18 to 24, 28.1% from 25 to 44, 19.3% from 45 to 64, and 14.4% who were 65 years of age or older. The median age was 34 years. For every 100 females, there were 97.2 males. For every 100 females age 18 and over, there were 92.2 males.

The median income for a household in the city was $32,031, and the median income for a family was $36,638. Males had a median income of $38,929 versus $23,125 for females. The per capita income for the city was $13,629. About 13.9% of families and 19.4% of the population were below the poverty line, including 22.5% of those under age 18 and 12.7% of those age 65 or over.

Education
The Elma School District has four schools.  Elma Elementary School serves children in an Early Childhood Program, as well as kindergarten through 5th grade.  Elma Middle School consists of 6th grade through 8th grade students; Elma High School houses 9th through 12th grade, and the East Grays Harbor High School provides alternative education.  The mascot for Elma High School and Middle School is an eagle. Their colors are blue and white. The mascot for East Grays Harbor High School is a Gryphon. Their colors are Black and Turquoise.

Elma High School also participates in the Running Start program, which gives grade 11, and 12 students the opportunity to take college level classes for college credit via Grays Harbor College (Aberdeen, WA), and Washington State University (Pullman, WA).

In terms of early childhood development programs, there are several daycares, a co-op preschool, and a Head Start facility.

References

External links

 City of Elma

Cities in Washington (state)
Cities in Grays Harbor County, Washington
Populated places established in 1853
1853 establishments in Washington Territory